Wadih Gosn (born 26 October 1953) is a Lebanese judoka. He competed in the men's middleweight event at the 1972 Summer Olympics.

References

1953 births
Living people
Lebanese male judoka
Olympic judoka of Lebanon
Judoka at the 1972 Summer Olympics
Place of birth missing (living people)